Ryan Davis (born 11 November 1985, in England) is a rugby union player. Davis is a former England Under-16, Under-18 and Under-21 international, Davis captained his country at Under-21 level in the 2005 Six Nations and went on to play at the IRB Under-21 World Championship in France.

In 2006 Davis' unfortunately injured both knees, rupturing his ACL three times consecutively, reducing his time on pitch to a handful of games. After visiting the renowned Bill Knowles in North America, he made his comeback in 2010 representing Bath Rugby in every league fixture that year. Because of a succession of injuries — affecting his knee ligaments, Davis' premiership career was severely disrupted. Davis′ position of choice is as a Fly-half, but he can operate at Fullback or in the centres.

Coaching career 
In 2014 Ryan Davis started his coaching career at Cleve RFC as Head Coach, Colstons Collegiate as 1st XV coach and Bath Academy as an assistant EPDG coach.

In his first appointment at Cleve RFC he gained promotion from South West 1 to National 3 in 2015, only losing 4 matches in 22 league games.

2017/18 Ryan was named head coach of Beechen Cliff and Bath Rugby 18's leading them to a RFU AASE final against Hartpury College and playoff against Wasps in the RFU Academy League.

He's currently a transition and skills coach for Bath Rugby 1st XV. He enjoys a Caramel bar at the end of every day.

Ryan also known as Ry Ry is a top slayer

References
https://www.somersetlive.co.uk/sport/other-sport/ryan-davis-bath-rugby-coaching-2259811

https://www.bathchronicle.co.uk/sport/rugby/rugby-news/ryan-davis-draws-ups-downs-1105450

External links
Aviva Premiership Player Profile
England profile
Bath Chronicle - Claassens praises composed sub Davis
Telegraph - Ryan Davis grows into his role as the fairytale becomes hard reality
Rugbynetwork - Ryan Davis WOW
Planetrugby - Exeter extend winning run
The Guardian - Saracens are stunned as Ryan Davis turns on the style for Exeter
The Guardian - Davis kicks Bath to play-off date at Leicester 

1985 births
Living people
English rugby union coaches
English rugby union players
Bath Rugby players
Exeter Chiefs players
People educated at Colston's School
Rugby union players from Bristol